Ethel Harrington (born June 18, 1907, in Winnipeg, Manitoba, Canada) was an American track and field sprinter. She ran the 100 meters for the United States at the 1932 Summer Olympics. She died November 23, 1972, in Miami, Florida, United States.

External links

1907 births
1972 deaths
American female sprinters
Canadian emigrants to the United States
Canadian female sprinters
Athletes from Winnipeg
Athletes (track and field) at the 1932 Summer Olympics
Olympic track and field athletes of the United States
20th-century American women
20th-century American people
Olympic female sprinters